Pseudolobodillo principensis is an endemic species of armadillo woodlice, land crustacean isopods of the family Armadillidae. It occurs in the island of Príncipe in São Tomé and Príncipe. It is the only species of the genus Pseudolobodillo. The genus and the species were described in 1983 by Helmut Schmalfuss and Franco Ferrara.

References

Further reading
 Schmalfuss, H. 2003. World catalog of terrestrial isopods (Isopoda: Oniscidea). Stuttgarter Beiträge zur Naturkunde, Serie A Nr. 654: 341 pp.

Woodlice
Endemic fauna of Príncipe
Invertebrates of São Tomé and Príncipe
Monotypic crustacean genera
Crustaceans described in 1983